Darragh Ryan is a retired Irish sportsperson. He played hurling with the Wexford senior inter-county team and won an All Star award in 2001, being picked in the right corner back position.

References

External links
GAA Info Profile

Living people
Wexford inter-county hurlers
Year of birth missing (living people)